Senbon Street (千本通 せんぼんどおり Senbon dōri) is one of the major streets running from north to south in the city of Kyoto, Japan. It extends from the Takagamine area of the Kita-ku (north) to the vicinity of Nōso, in the Fushimi-ku (south).

History 

The section of present-day Senbon Street located between Nijō and Kujō streets corresponds to the Suzaku Avenue, the central and most important road of the ancient Heian-kyō, which was 84 meters wide and approximately 4 km long. Later, one thousand (千本 senbon) stupas were built as an offering and it is believed that because of this the current name of the street came to use.

Relevant landmarks along the street 

Bukkyo University Nijō Campus.
Nijō Station.
Ritsumeikan University Nijō Campus.
Tambaguchi Station.
 Umekoji Park.
Kyoto Railway Museum.
Site of the Heian Kyō Rashōmon (Rajōmon) Gate.

References

Links 

 Kyoto Railway Museum
Urban Hotel Kyoto-Nijo Premium

Streets in Kyoto
Odonyms referring to religion